The Téléphérique du Salève is a passenger cable car providing access to the top of the Salève in Haute-Savoie, France, overlooking the city of Geneva, Switzerland. The cable car is operated by a joint venture between RATP (through its subsidiary RATP Dev), Transports Publics Genevois, and COMAG (a subsidiary of lift manufacturer Poma).

History 
The cable car was inaugurated in 1932, replacing a now-disused rack railway (for which one of the tunnels can still be seen walking up). It was shut down in 2021 (delayed from 2020 due to the COVID-19 pandemic) for refurbishment, and is scheduled to re-open in 2023. The projected cost is 12 million euros.

Features 
The base station in Étrembières is at an altitude of 432m, while the top station at 1097m. The cable car climbs very steeply due to the near-vertical face of the ridge, with an ascension of 665m in an overall length of 1172m.

The cabins can hold up to 60 people each.

References

External links
  Official site

Cable cars in France
1932 establishments in France
Transport infrastructure completed in 1932
RATP Group
Tourist attractions in Haute-Savoie